Redhead is a 1941 American comedy film directed by Edward L. Cahn and starring Johnny Downs, June Lang, and Eric Blore.

Cast list
 Johnny Downs as Ted Brown
 June Lang as Dale Carter
 Eric Blore as Scoop

See also
 Redhead (1934 film)

References

External links 
 

American comedy films
1941 comedy films
American black-and-white films
Films directed by Edward L. Cahn
Monogram Pictures films
1941 films
1940s English-language films
1940s American films